Rostom Otarovich Torgashvili (born 15 December 1964) is a Georgian former footballer who played as a midfielder and made one appearance for the Georgia national team.

Career
Torgashvili earned his first and only cap for Georgia on 27 May 1990 in the country's first international match, a friendly against Lithuania. He came on as a half-time substitute for Zaza Revishvili in the home fixture, which took place in Tbilisi and finished as a 2–2 draw.

Career statistics

International

References

External links
 
 
 

1964 births
Living people
People from Kakheti
Footballers from Georgia (country)
Georgia (country) international footballers
Association football midfielders
FC Dinamo Tbilisi players
FC Dila Gori players
FC Dinamo Batumi players
FC Torpedo Kutaisi players
FC Metalurgi Rustavi players
Soviet First League players
Soviet Second League players
Erovnuli Liga players